Zorka is a given name. Notable people with the name include:

Zorka Grandov (1947–2021), Serbian economist
Zorka Janů (1921–1946), Czech film actress, younger sister of cinema star Lída Baarová
Princess Zorka of Montenegro (1864–1890), and later became Princess Zorka Karađorđević in Serbia
Zorka Parvanova (born 1958), Bulgarian historian and former First Lady of Bulgaria
Zorka Ságlová (1943–2003), Czech artist
Zorka Todosić (1864–1936), Serbian stage actress and operetta singer
Zorka Velimirović (1883–1963), Serbian translator

Other 
 Zorka (genus), an insect genus in the tribe Typhlocybini
Zorka Color, a Serbian ceramics and paint company acquired by Tikkurila (corporation) in 2011

See also
 FC Zorka-BDU Minsk, Belarusian football team, based in Minsk, Belarus
 Zork, an interactive fiction computer game
 Zora (disambiguation)

Serbian feminine given names